John of Foix or Jean de Foix may refer to:
John I, Count of Foix (died 1436)
John de Foix, 1st Earl of Kendal (died 1485)
John of Foix, Viscount of Narbonne (died 1500)
John III of Navarre (died 1516), was also Count John II of Foix